José Bódalo Zúffoli (March 24, 1916 – July 24, 1985) was an Argentine-born Spanish film actor.

Biography
Bódalo was born in Córdoba, Argentina, the son of Rome-born actress Eugenia Zúffoli and Spanish actor and singer José Bódalo, Sr. His birth in Argentina coincided with his family's artistic tour, but he soon moved to Madrid, where he began studying medicine. He made over 120 film and TV appearances between 1930 and his death in 1985.

From the mid to late 1960s he prolifically appeared in Spaghetti Western films which were often Spanish and Italian co produced. He played the role of General Hugo Rodriguez in the 1966 film Django opposite Franco Nero; and also performed in Begin the Beguine, the film that won the 1982 Academy Award for Best Foreign Language Film.

He appeared in many comedy or drama films in Spain but also appeared in many television series particularly after 1970 such as Novela from 1969–1977 and Estudio 1 in the early 1980s.

He died on 24 July 1985 at the age of 69.

Selected filmography

 El secreto del doctor (1930) - Sr. Redding
 Alhucemas (1948) - Comandante Almendro
 Delírio de Amor (1948)
 Tempestad en el alma (1950)
 Agustina of Aragon (1950) - Capitán francés
 Vendaval (1950) - Pedro Montero
 Truhanes de honor (1950) - Gomané
 Balarrasa (1951) - Presidente del club
 A Tale of Two Villages (1951)
 Come Die My Love (1952) - Eddie
 Facultad de letras (1952)
 Devil's Roundup (1952) - Hombre
 Amaya (1952) - Teodosio
 La laguna negra (1952) - Venargas
 Cabaret (1953) - Luis
 Flight 971 (1953) - Hugo Carrara
 Three are Three (1955) - (segment "Introducción: Tribunal")
 El andén (1957) - Manuel
 Frei Escova (1961) - (uncredited)
 Vamos a contar mentiras (1961) - Juan
 Kill and Be Killed (1962) - Doctor Cáceres
 Teresa de Jesús (1962) - Padre confesor
 The Mustard Grain (1962) - Horcajo
 Los derechos de la mujer (1963) - El cónyuge
 Cristo negro (1963) - Janson
 The Twin Girls (1963) - Raphael Carrasco Ramírez
 El juego de la verdad (1963) - Miguel
 Ensayo general para la muerte (1963) - Dr. Víctor Lepetre
 Los elegidos (1964) - Padre de Miguel
 El pecador y la bruja (1964) - Padre Enrique
 El salario del crimen (1964) - Vílchez - Comisario de policía
 Búsqueme a esa chica (1964) - Lorenzo - padre de Marisol
 Prohibido soñar (1964)
 Cotolay (1965) - Maese Mateo
 Ringo's Big Night (1966) - Sheriff Sam
 Dollars for a Fast Gun (1966) - Martin
 Spies Strike Silently (1966) - Inspector Craig
 Django (1966) - Gen. Hugo Rodriguez
 La Barrera (1966) - Panadero
 Nuevo en esta plaza (1966) - Manuel Romero
 Killer 77, Alive or Dead (1966) - George King
 Hoy como ayer (1966) - Aniceto72
 Sound of Horror (1966) - Mr. Dorman
 Thompson 1880 (1966) - Judge Lennox
 Fantasía... 3 (1966) - (uncredited)
 Las cicatrices (1967) - Miguel Benjumea
 Red Blood, Yellow Gold (1967) - El Primero
 Train for Durango (1968) - Mexican Boss
 Persecución hasta Valencia (1968) - Marcos
 It's Your Move (1968) - Ispettore Vogel
 Day After Tomorrow (1968) - Colonel Jefferson
 Los que tocan el piano (1968) - Don Ernesto Dávila, inspector de policía
 Giugno '44 - Sbarcheremo in Normandia (1968) - Duvallier
 Setenta veces siete (1968)
 Las amigas (1969) - Luisito
 Blood in the Bullring (1969) - Rafael
 Garringo (1969) - Sheriff Klaus
 Educando a una idiota (1969) - Eurico Sánchez Fil
 El mejor del mundo (1970) - Padre de José
 Compañeros (1970) - General Mongo Álvarez
 Un aller simple (1971) - (uncredited)
 Captain Apache (1971) - General
 Aventura en las islas Cíes (1972)
 Una mujer prohibida (1974) - Comisario
 Unmarried Mothers (1975)
 El mejor regalo (1975) - Don Carlos Álvarez
 Ambitious (1976) - D. Matías
 La espada negra (1976) - Alfonso Carrillo de Acuña, Arzobispo de Toledo
 Réquiem por un empleado (1978)
 Father Cami's Wedding (1979) - Padre Antonio Bissus
 Tiempos de constitución (1979)
 And in the Third Year, He Rose Again (1980) - Cura de Rebollar de la Mata
 Spoiled Children (1980) - Don Fabián de Luna (1978)
 El Crack (1981) - Don Ricardo
 Asalto al casino (1981)
 Begin the Beguine (1982) - Roxiu
 Las chicas del bingo (1982) - Vicente
 La colmena (1982) - Don Roque
 El Crack (1983) - Don Ricardo
 The Autonomines (1983) - Don Luciano
 The Cheerful Colsada Girls (1984) - Don Matías
 El último kamikaze (1984) - Sr. Fulton
 Últimas tardes con Teresa (1984) - Cardenal
 Mi amigo el vagabundo (1984) - Esopo
 Sesión continua (1984) - Dionisio Balboa

References

External links
 

1916 births
1985 deaths
Argentine male film actors
Argentine people of Italian descent
Spanish male film actors
Spanish male television actors
Spanish people of Italian descent
Male Spaghetti Western actors
Male Western (genre) film actors
Argentine emigrants to Spain
People of Lazian descent
20th-century Argentine male actors